Diane Bernstein Kunz (born November 9, 1952) is an American author, historian, and lawyer from Durham, North Carolina, and executive director of a not-for-profit adoption advocacy group, the Center for Adoption Policy.  She is the author of Butter and Guns (1997), an overview of America's Cold War economic diplomacy.

Biography
Diane Bernstein Kunz was born November 9, 1952 in Queens, New York.

She gained a bachelor's degree from Barnard College and a J.D. degree from Cornell University. 

She was a corporate lawyer from 1976 to 1983, then took an M.Litt in diplomatic and economic history at Oxford University. She received her PhD from Yale University in 1989; Gaddis Smith directed her dissertation. She taught diplomatic history at Yale. In a 1997 essay, she argued that "John F. Kennedy was a mediocre president. Had he obtained a second term, federal civil rights policy during the 1960s would have been substantially less productive and US actions in Vietnam no different from what actually occurred. His tragic assassination was not a tragedy for the course of American history." In 1996 and 1998 she was twice declined tenure at Yale, to the surprise of her students and colleagues. She taught at Columbia University from 1998–2001, and was a research scholar at New York Law School from 2004–2005, where she has organised annual conferences on adoption policy. She founded the Center for Adoption Policy with Ann N. Reese in 2001, and practices adoption law with Rumbold & Seidelman. She currently teaches as a senior lecturing fellow at the Duke University School of Law.

She has four sons and four adopted daughters from China.

Publications 
Butter and Guns (1997), an overview of America's Cold War economic diplomacy. 
The Diplomacy of the Crucial Decade (1994), discussion of diplomacy in 1960's America.  (cloth), 
The Economic Diplomacy of the Suez Crisis (1991) Chapel Hill : University of North Carolina Press, c1991. xii, 295 p. : ports. ; 24 cm.  (alk. paper)
The Battle for Britain's Gold Standard in 1931 (1987) London and New York: Croom Helm. viii, 207 p. ; 23 cm.

References

1952 births
Living people
Yale University faculty
Adoption workers
21st-century American historians
American lawyers
Yale University alumni
American women lawyers
American women historians
Barnard College alumni
Cornell University alumni
21st-century American women writers